St James' Church is an Anglican church in St James Place, Toxteth, Liverpool, England.  It is recorded in the National Heritage List for England as a designated Grade II* listed building. Having been declared redundant in 1974, it returned to active use in 2010.

History

The church was built in 1774–75 by Cuthbert Bisbrown, who probably also designed it.  The timber roof was added in 1846 by William Culshaw. The chancel, designed by H. Havelock Sutton, was built in 1900. On 1 October 1974 the church was declared redundant, and on 9 June 1976 was vested in the Churches Conservation Trust. In May 2010 the church was returned to the Liverpool Diocese, and was re-opened as the Church of St James in the City.  As it was in a "semi-derelict condition", a marquee was erected within the church to allow the resumption of worship. Meanwhile, repairs are being undertaken to secure the maintenance of the church's structure. It is intended that the building should be used, in addition for worship, as a 600-seater auditorium and an exhibition centre.

Architecture

Exterior
St James is constructed in red brick with stone dressings.  Its plan consists of a five-bay nave, a chancel, and a west tower.  Along the sides of the nave are two tiers of round-headed windows.  The tower is in four stages with an embattled parapet. Its third stage contains clock faces, and in the top stage are paired louvred bell openings.

Interior
The architectural style of the interior is "conventionally Georgian". There are galleries on three sides, carried on slim quatrefoil cast iron columns.  The columns are the earliest existing examples in Liverpool of cast iron columns, and are one of the earliest examples of them in England. The timber roof is open, with Norman-style arches. The east window is stained glass designed by Henry Holiday, dated 1881.  There are monuments dating from the late-18th and the early-19th centuries. Many of the monuments relate to the slave trade.

See also

Grade II* listed buildings in Merseyside
List of extant works by Culshaw and Sumners

References

Church of St James
Liverpool St James
Church of St James
Liverpool, Church of St James
Liverpool, Church of St James
18th-century Church of England church buildings
Liverpool, Church of St James
Toxteth